Saint-Aubin-le-Cauf is a commune in the Seine-Maritime department in the Normandy region in northern France.

Geography

Population

Places of interest
 The church of St. Aubin, dating from the thirteenth century.
 Some fifteenth- and sixteenth-century houses.
 La Chatellenie = 18th century demeure former house of Alexander Alekhine now a 4 star Guesthouse.

See also
Communes of the Seine-Maritime department

References

Communes of Seine-Maritime